Dave Pacella (born February 7, 1960) is a former American football center and guard. He played for the Washington Federals from 1983 to 1984 and for the Philadelphia Eagles in 1984.

References

1960 births
Living people
American football centers
American football offensive guards
Maryland Terrapins football players
Washington Federals/Orlando Renegades players
Philadelphia Eagles players